The Tomas Batilo class was a ship class of eight patrol boats that were previously service of the Philippine Navy. These ships were formerly used by the South Korean Navy as Chamsuri/Wildcat (PKM-200 series) class fast attack crafts. All eight ships have been retired from active service, with two units lost in separate incidents while the rest are in different state of disposal.

History
Formerly Chamsuri - Wildcat class fast attack craft of the South Korean Navy built in the 1970s, with Korean designation as Patrol Killer Medium (PKM). South Korea transferred the former ROKN ships to the Philippine government, with the first batch of five units namely the former PKM-225, 226, 229, 231, and 235 which were handed-over on 15 June 1995, and arrived in Manila in August 1995. This batch became the following ships:  ex-PKM 225;  ex-PKM 226;  ex-PKM 229;  ex-PKM 231; and BRP Ramon Aguirre (PG-115) ex-PKM 235. Except for PG-115 which was used as spares after being written-off during a delivery accident, all where commissioned to the Philippine Navy on 22 May 1996.

Another PKM was delivered to the Philippine Navy in 1998 and was originally for spares, but this was activated by the Philippine Navy on 2 July 1998 which became .

Ships in class

Gallery

References

External links
 Philippine Navy Official website

See also
 List of decommissioned ships of the Philippine Navy

Patrol boat classes
Patrol vessels of the Philippine Navy